Battaristis sphenodelta is a moth of the family Gelechiidae. It was described by Edward Meyrick in 1922. It is found in Brazil.

The wingspan is about 9 mm. The forewings are whitish ochreous, the costa suffused with white anteriorly and there is an elongate-triangular blackish blotch on the middle of the costa, as well as a wedge-shaped black costal blotch from just beyond this to near the apex, cut by a fine white subterminal line from three-fourths of the costa to the tornus, right angled in the middle and marked with a black dash on the angle. The apical area beyond this is brownish tinged, with some whitish suffusion towards the apex and along the termen. The hindwings are grey.

References

Moths described in 1922
Battaristis
Taxa named by Edward Meyrick